Withania chevalieri is a species of flowering plants of the family Solanaceae. The species is endemic to Cape Verde and is listed as critically endangered by the IUCN. The specific name refers to the French botanist Auguste Chevalier.

Distribution
The species is restricted to the islands of Santo Antão, Sal and Fogo. The plant is found from sea level up to 700 metres elevation.

References

chevalieri
Endemic flora of Cape Verde
Flora of Fogo, Cape Verde
Flora of Sal, Cape Verde
Flora of Santo Antão, Cape Verde